La Pâtisserie Gloppe is an 1889 oil on canvas painting by Jean Béraud, now in the musée Carnavalet in Paris. 

The Gloppe business originated in Roanne, opening its first Parisian premises before 1851 on rue Royale-Saint-Martin, then a second around 1873 at 9 boulevard des Italiens, and finally a third at rond-point des Champs-Elysées (now 2 avenue d'Antin). It ceased trading after 1915.

Notes

References

French paintings
1889 paintings
Genre paintings
Paintings in the collection of the Musée Carnavalet